Syllitus niger is a species of beetle in the family Cerambycidae. It was described by Gressitt in 1959.

References

Stenoderini
Beetles described in 1959